Altonah (also Altona) is an unincorporated community in central Duchesne County, Utah, United States.

Description

The community is located on the Uintah and Ouray Indian Reservation along local roads north of State Route 87, north of the city of Duchesne, the county seat of Duchesne County. Although Altonah is unincorporated, it has a post office, with the ZIP code of 84002.

Altonah was originally settled in 1906, under the name of Alexander. It was renamed in 1912.

See also

References

External links

Unincorporated communities in Duchesne County, Utah
Unincorporated communities in Utah